is head of Shorinjiryu Kenkokan Karate.

He is a descendant of Seiwa and son of the founder of Shorinjiryu Kenkokan Karate, Kōri Hisataka. He started his training in judo and karate at the age of three and obtained a shodan in both disciplines by the time he was 13.

He won the All-Japan Open Karatedo Championship in 1961 and 1962 and the Shorinjiryu Kenkokan Championship from 1958 to 1962. He graduated from Nihon University, holding a 4th dan in judo and a 5th dan in karate.

Hisataka represented Japan at the World's Fairs in New York City (1964) and Montreal (1967).  He taught karate at Columbia University, State University of New York, McGill University, Loyola College, The National Theatre School of Canada, & St-Jerome college.

In the 1980s Masayuki Hisataka created the World Koshiki Karatedo Federation (WKKF), which is an organization for 'safe contact' fighting competition with protective chest and headgear using Koshiki rules with the intention of Karate being accepted into the Olympics. Koshiki black belt certification and Koshiki referee certification is offered in the WKKF.  Currently, Hisataka is ranked Hanshi 10th Dan, Shorinjiryu Kenkokan Karate-Do, and Koshiki Karate-Do.

He has also written two books about Shorinjiryu Karate: "Scientific Karatedo" (published in 1976) and "Essential Shorinjiryu Karatedo" (published in 1994). "Le Karate Koshiki", published only in French, focuses on training for Koshiki style competition fighting and other technical aspects.

Shorinjiryu Kenkokan International Branches
Shorinjiryu Kenkokan Karate Do is represented around the world by its international branches directly affiliated to the Shorinjiryu Kenkokan Karate Hombu Dojo in Japan. Some of the major international Chief Instructors include:
Japan: Masayuki Hisataka 10th Dan, Hiroshi Hisataka 7th Dan, Masamitsu Kudaka 7th Dan, Masaki Enomoto 6th Dan
Australia: Scott Brown 6th Dan
USA: Mega Martinez 6th Dan 
Canada: Philippe Nadeau 7th Dan 
Germany: Olaf Lotze 6th Dan
New Zealand: Shaun O'Leary 5th Dan,Masaki Enomoto 6th Dan 
Switzerland: Mamadou Diallo 6th Dan
Venezuela: Kunio Tanabe 6th Dan
Spain: Luis Peres Santiago 5th Dan
Other branches include Hong Kong, India, Spain, United Kingdom, Netherlands, France & Russia. There are no descendant schools of the Shorinjiryu Kenkokan recorded at the Shorinjiryu Kenkokan Karatedo Headquarters in Japan, or the official website.

References

Scientific Karatedo, Japan Publications, Inc. 

Living people
1940 births
Japanese male karateka
Nihon University alumni